Pioneer Junior High School is a junior high school in Upland, California.  It serves seventh and eighth graders in the northern part of Upland.

Distinguished School
Pioneer is a California Distinguished School, winning the award in the spring of 2007. On March 20, 2008, the school received the Governor's Challenge Front Runner award. For the 2007–08 school year, both seventh and eighth grade Academic Pentathlon teams received first place. For the 2008–2009 school year, Pioneer's Eighth Grade Academic Pentathlon team took first place overall, first place in each category, and the top participant in each division. For the 2007–2008 year, Pioneer took first, second, and third place in the National PTA Reflections Program for their students' achievements.

Accelerated Program
Pioneer's accelerated program allows students performing at a high academic level to take more challenging classes.  Advanced classes are offered in English, History, and Math. For Math, entering seventh graders who pass the Algebra test at the start of their Seventh-grade year take Algebra 1 instead of Pre-Algebra and eighth graders who pass Algebra I take Geometry.  Enrollment in the accelerated program is based on teacher recommendation, STAR test scores, and grades.

PSN: Pioneer School News
Pioneer School News is the cable-based television broadcast that is shown throughout the school in homeroom period, announcing that day's schedule, lunch menu, special announcements, school event dates, general school information, and club dates and meeting times. PSN is put on under the supervision of Mr. Mooney, and before by Mr. Sawhill. PSN is offered as an elective, but requires an application in 7th grade for either 3rd trimester participation, or participation in 8th grade. Students use Apple software such as iMovie and greenscreens to produce opening and closing sequences, commercials to promote school codes or events, ultimately teaching the relation of everyday life and technology, and how these skills can be used as they further their education careers into high school and college. The PSN website states the program is funded by contributions.

References

External links
 Upland Unified School District
 Pioneer Junior High

Public middle schools in California